Daouda Guindo (born 14 October 2002) is a Malian professional footballer who plays as a left-back for Swiss club St. Gallen, on loan from Red Bull Salzburg.

Club career
In January 2021, Guindo signed with Austrian club Red Bull Salzburg, signing a four-year contract and leaving his native Mali. He was immediately loaned to Salzburg's feeder club, FC Liefering. He made his debut for the club on 12 February 2021, playing the entirety of a 3–1 home victory over Austria Lustenau.

On 27 June 2022, Guindo was loaned to St. Gallen in Switzerland for the 2022–23 season. He made his debut for the club on the first matchday of the season, coming on as a half-time substitute for Leonidas Stergiou in a 1–0 away loss to Servette. A strong start to the season individually was capped off with his first assist on 6 August in the 3–2 league loss to Grasshoppers.

International career
Guindo was called up to the Mali national team for matches in June 2022.

Career statistics

Honours
Austrian Bundesliga: 2021-22
Austrian Cup: 2021-22

References

External links

Daouda Guindo at JMG Football

2002 births
Living people
Malian footballers
Mali international footballers
Association football defenders
Austrian Football Bundesliga players
2. Liga (Austria) players
FC Red Bull Salzburg players
FC Liefering players
FC St. Gallen players
Malian expatriate footballers
Malian expatriate sportspeople in Austria
Expatriate footballers in Austria
Malian expatriate sportspeople in Switzerland
Expatriate footballers in Switzerland